The 1974–75 season was the 73rd in the history of the Western Football League.

The champions for the first time in their history were newcomers Falmouth Town. Falmouth were the first Cornish club to play in the Western League, and they won the league at their first attempt, remaining unbeaten throughout the season.

This was the first season in which three points were awarded for a win, rather than the traditional two points.

League table
The league was increased from 19 clubs to 21 after Avon Bradford and Exeter City Reserves left, and four new clubs joined:

Falmouth Town
Melksham Town
Paulton Rovers, rejoining the league after leaving in 1960.
Westland-Yeovil
Ashtonians United merged with Clevedon and retained their place in the league under the Clevedon name.

References

1974-75
5